The European Film Award for Best Supporting Actress was awarded by the European Film Academy to actor or actress of European language films.

Winners and nominees

1980s

External links 

 European Film Academy archive

Awards established in 1989
Film acting awards
Best Supporting Performance